Barytelphusa cunicularis is a common species of freshwater crab found almost all over India, excluding Northeast India.

Description 
The carapace is of a dark chestnut black color, and is nearly smooth. The claws are of the color of the shell, but the basal joint of the first and the whole of the other legs are much paler-colored, being of a dirty testaceous brown, with very numerous small transverse black marks.

Ecology
Barytelphusa cunicularis builds borrows in an rectangular shape especially in the tributaries of the Godavari River in Nanded.

At the edge of a pool in a seasonal streambed in Agumbe, Karnataka a crab was seen feeding on Pterocryptis wynaadensis, a species of catfish. It is unclear how the crab was able to catch such a large prey animal.

In Rangana Fort, There was an observation of a crab feeding on tadpoles of Amboli leaping frog in a rocky crevice. Another freshwater crab in India, Ghatiana atropurpurea was also found in a pond filled with tadpoles.The occurrence of this observation and G.atropurpurea feeding on tadpoles, poses that B.cunicularis has a possible tendency to hunt tadpoles along with other freshwater crabs in India.

Cultivation and consumption by humans
Barytelphusa cunicularis along with Barusa guerini are consumed by humans, mostly in Maharashtra. B.cunicularis is preferred as Barusa guerini is smaller and less body mass is present and so it is unfit for cooking.The crabs are collected by certain crab catching communities or experts belonging to certain castes and tribes. Then they are sold in the weekly markets. They are not exhibited in special crab markets but rather in fish markets. The species is hardy to withstand  without water in moist and can airbreath and remain live without food for a few days. As a result, these crabs are easy to maintain and are in high demand in local markets.

The carapace is removed and the crab is crushed used a grinder and an mixer. The body extract is used to make a special 'crab curry', which is prepared using local condiments. The residue of the carapace is discarded.

For cultivation, an experiment was conducted to study the growth and survival of the crab, it was fed with different feeds. It was seen that the crabs preferred a mix diet of clams and fish in captivity.

Pollution and diseases
Shell disease appears to occur in the crab through fungal infections and infected individuals have an prominent yellow coloured circular lesions on the ventral carapace.

References 

Grapsoidea
Crustaceans described in 2022
Arthropods of India
Fauna of Karnataka